Barkad Jadid (also Romanized as Barḵāɖ Jadīd; also known as Barkāh) is a village in Keybar Rural District, Jolgeh Zozan District, Khaf County, Razavi Khorasan Province, Iran. At the 2006 census, its population was 452, in 97 families.

See also 

 List of cities, towns and villages in Razavi Khorasan Province

References 

Populated places in Khaf County